Nashville Electric Service is one of the 12 largest public electric utilities in the United States, distributing energy to more than 370,000 customers in Middle Tennessee.

Operation
The Nashville Electric Service is governed by a five member Board, appointed by the Mayor and confirmed by the Metro Council. Members serve five-year staggered terms without pay. The board appoints a chief executive officer who has responsibility for day-to-day operations, including hiring of employees.

The NES purchases their power from the Tennessee Valley Authority (TVA), a federally owned utility which serves Tennessee and parts of six surrounding states. In 2016, the sources of electricity purchased by the NES from TVA included 39.8% nuclear, 25.8% coal-fired, 21.5% natural gas-fired, 9.7% hydroelectric power, and 3.2% from wind and solar.

History
In 1938, the Tennessee Electric Power Company, the investor-owned utility for the Nashville area since 1922, sued the Tennessee Valley Authority for selling power in Nashville.  TEPCO lost the suit, and was broken up in 1939.  TVA bought TEPCO's assets for $79 million, while the city of Nashville took over TEPCO's power generation and distribution network and created the Electric Power Board of Nashville to run it.  The Board adopted Nashville Electric Service as its operating name, and TEPCO's 500 employees became employees of NES.  The board became part of the newly formed metropolitan government after the merger of Nashville and Davidson County in 1963.

See also
Tennessee Valley Authority

Notes

External links 
 

Municipal electric utilities of the United States
Companies based in Tennessee